Benjamin Bert Carl (Ben) Crabbé (Tienen, 12 November 1962) is a famous Belgian quizmaster, talkshow host and musician. 
He became well known as drummer in Belgian rockband De Kreuners. He is quizmaster at Belgium's longest running quiz-show Blokken, since 5 September 1994. He was voted Belgium's Favorite TV Personality twice, in 2002 and 2005.

References 

Flemish television presenters
Living people
1962 births
Belgian drummers
Belgian game show hosts